Robert Gerard "Bob" Cooper (born 26 July 1968) is the Archdeacon of Sunderland, honorary canon of Durham Cathedral and canon of Musoma Cathedral in Mara, Tanzania.

He was formerly Area Dean of Pontefract and Vicar of St Giles' Church, Pontefract.

He held parish ministry positions in the former Dioceses of Ripon and Leeds and Wakefield (now the Diocese of Leeds) and was a school chaplain in Leeds before spending a year as a chaplain in a school in Essex. He has been visiting Mara, Tanzania since 2000.

He was elected to General Synod of the Church of England by the Diocese of Leeds.

References

External links 
 http://www.stgilespontefract.org.uk

Archdeacons of Sunderland
Living people
20th-century English Anglican priests
1962 births
People from Oldham